The Beninese ambassador in Washington, D. C. is the official representative of the Government in Porto-Novo to the Government of the United States.

List of representatives

References 

Ambassadors of Benin to the United States
United States
Benin